In mathematics, particularly linear algebra and numerical analysis, the Gram–Schmidt process is a method for orthonormalizing a set of vectors in an inner product space, most commonly the Euclidean space  equipped with the standard inner product.

The method is named after Jørgen Pedersen Gram and Erhard Schmidt, but Pierre-Simon Laplace had been familiar with it before Gram and Schmidt. In the theory of Lie group decompositions, it is generalized by the Iwasawa decomposition.

The application of the Gram–Schmidt process to the column vectors of a full column rank matrix yields the QR decomposition (it is decomposed into an orthogonal and a triangular matrix).

The Gram–Schmidt process  

We define the projection operator by

where  denotes the inner product of the vectors v and u. This operator projects the vector v orthogonally onto the line spanned by vector u. If u = 0, we define , i.e., the projection map  is the zero map, sending every vector to the zero vector.

The Gram–Schmidt process then works as follows:

The sequence  is the required system of orthogonal vectors, and the normalized vectors  form an orthonormal set. The calculation of the sequence  is known as Gram–Schmidt orthogonalization, while the calculation of the sequence  is known as Gram–Schmidt orthonormalization as the vectors are normalized.

To check that these formulas yield an orthogonal sequence, first compute  by substituting the above formula for u2: we get zero. Then use this to compute  again by substituting the formula for u3: we get zero. The general proof proceeds by mathematical induction.

The vector ui is then defined to be the difference between vi and this projection, guaranteed to be orthogonal to all of the vectors in the subspace U.

The Gram–Schmidt process also applies to a linearly independent countably infinite sequence . The result is an orthogonal (or orthonormal) sequence  such that for natural number :

If an orthonormal basis is to be produced, then the algorithm should test for zero vectors in the output and discard them because no multiple of a zero vector can have a length of 1. The number of vectors output by the algorithm will then be the dimension of the space spanned by the original inputs.

Example

Euclidean space

Now, perform Gram–Schmidt, to obtain an orthogonal set of vectors:

noting that if the dot product of two vectors is 0 then they are orthogonal.

For non-zero vectors, we can then normalize the vectors by dividing out their sizes as shown above:

Properties 

Denote by  the result of applying the Gram–Schmidt process to a collection of vectors . This yields a map .

It has the following properties:

 It is continuous
 It is orientation preserving in the sense that .
 It commutes with orthogonal maps:

Let  be orthogonal (with respect to the given inner product). Then we have

Further a parametrized version of the Gram–Schmidt process yields a (strong) deformation retraction of the general linear group  onto the orthogonal group .

Numerical stability 
When this process is implemented on a computer, the vectors  are often not quite orthogonal, due to rounding errors. For the Gram–Schmidt process as described above (sometimes referred to as "classical Gram–Schmidt") this loss of orthogonality is particularly bad; therefore, it is said that the (classical) Gram–Schmidt process is numerically unstable.

The Gram–Schmidt process can be stabilized by a small modification; this version is sometimes referred to as modified Gram-Schmidt or MGS. This approach gives the same result as the original formula in exact arithmetic and introduces smaller errors in finite-precision arithmetic.
Instead of computing the vector  as

it is computed as

This method is used in the previous animation, when the intermediate  vector is used when orthogonalizing the blue vector .

Here is another description of the modified algorithm. In formulas, . Next, we orthogonalize those remaining vectors against . This means we compute  by subtraction . As should be clear now, the next step orthogonalizes  against . Proceeding in this manner we find the full set of orthogonal vectors . If orthonormal vectors are desired, then we normalize as we go, so that the denominators in the subtraction formulas turn into ones.

Algorithm 
The following MATLAB algorithm implements the Gram–Schmidt orthonormalization for Euclidean Vectors. The vectors  (columns of matrix V, so that V(:,j) is the jth vector) are replaced by orthonormal vectors (columns of U) which span the same subspace.

function U = gramschmidt(V)
    [n, k] = size(V);
    U = zeros(n,k);
    U(:,1) = V(:,1) / norm(V(:,1));
    for i = 2:k
        U(:,i) = V(:,i);
        for j = 1:i-1
            U(:,i) = U(:,i) - (U(:,j)'*U(:,i)) * U(:,j);
        end
        U(:,i) = U(:,i) / norm(U(:,i));
    end
end

The cost of this algorithm is asymptotically  floating point operations, where  is the dimensionality of the vectors.

Via Gaussian elimination 

However the matrix  must be brought to row echelon form, using only the row operation of adding a scalar multiple of one row to another. For example, taking  as above, we have

And reducing this to row echelon form produces

The normalized vectors are then

as in the example above.

Determinant formula 
The result of the Gram–Schmidt process may be expressed in a non-recursive formula using determinants.

where D0=1 and, for j ≥ 1, Dj is the Gram determinant

Note that the expression for uk is a "formal" determinant, i.e. the matrix contains both scalars
and vectors; the meaning of this expression is defined to be the result of a cofactor expansion along the row of vectors.

The determinant formula for the Gram-Schmidt is computationally slower (exponentially slower) than the recursive algorithms described above; it is mainly of theoretical interest.

Expressed using geometric algebra 
Expressed using notation used in geometric algebra, the unnormalized results of the Gram–Schmidt process can be expressed as

which is equivalent to the expression using the  operator defined above. The results can equivalently be expressed as

which is closely related to the expression using determinants above.

Alternatives 
Other orthogonalization algorithms use Householder transformations or Givens rotations. The algorithms using Householder transformations are more stable than the stabilized Gram–Schmidt process. On the other hand, the Gram–Schmidt process produces the th orthogonalized vector after the th iteration, while orthogonalization using Householder reflections produces all the vectors only at the end. This makes only the Gram–Schmidt process applicable for iterative methods like the Arnoldi iteration.

Yet another alternative is motivated by the use of Cholesky decomposition for inverting the matrix of the normal equations in linear least squares. Let  be a full column rank matrix, whose columns need to be orthogonalized. The matrix  is Hermitian and positive definite, so it can be written as  using the Cholesky decomposition. The lower triangular matrix  with strictly positive diagonal entries is invertible. Then columns of the matrix  are orthonormal and span the same subspace as the columns of the original matrix . The explicit use of the product  makes the algorithm unstable, especially if the product's condition number is large. Nevertheless, this algorithm is used in practice and implemented in some software packages because of its high efficiency and simplicity.

In quantum mechanics there are several orthogonalization schemes with characteristics better suited for certain applications than original Gram–Schmidt. Nevertheless, it remains a popular and effective algorithm for even the largest electronic structure calculations.

References

Sources 
 .
 .
 .
 .

External links 

 
 Harvey Mudd College Math Tutorial on the Gram-Schmidt algorithm
 Earliest known uses of some of the words of mathematics: G The entry "Gram-Schmidt orthogonalization" has some information and references on the origins of the method.
 Demos: Gram Schmidt process in plane and Gram Schmidt process in space
 Gram-Schmidt orthogonalization applet
 NAG Gram–Schmidt orthogonalization of n vectors of order m routine
 Proof: Raymond Puzio, Keenan Kidwell. "proof of Gram-Schmidt orthogonalization algorithm" (version 8). PlanetMath.org.

Linear algebra
Functional analysis
Articles with example MATLAB/Octave code